Marzouki is an Arabic surname, it may refer to:

 Ahmed Marzouki, Moroccan military officer.
 Mehdi Marzouki, Tunisian footballer.
 Hamdi Marzouki, Tunisian footballer.
 Moncef Marzouki, fourth President of Tunisia.
 Mohamed Habib Marzouki, Tunisian academic, philosopher and politician.

Arabic-language surnames